Devotional objects (also, devotional articles, devotional souvenirs, devotional artifacts) are religious souvenirs (figurines, pictures, votive candles, books, amulets, and others), owned and carried by the religious, who see them as imbued with spiritual values, and use them for votive offering. Production and sales of devotional articles have become a widespread industry in the vicinity of various religious sites all over the world.

Devotional articles have a long history; in Christianity they have been mentioned in historical works such as those related to Paul the Apostle and in older religions they have been traced as far back as the times of ancient Egypt and ancient Mesopotamia. International law defines "devotional articles" as including "the Bible, the Koran, prayer and service books, hymnals, ritual articles, sacramental wine, crucifixes and rosaries". Such items may be natural and hardly processed (such as earth from the Holy Land), but majority of modern devotional articles are mass-produced (strips of paper with prayers, pictures of holy figures, prayer books, etc.) Such items are usually seen as having little artistic value, as their primary function is not decorative but spiritual.

American sociologist Charles H. Lippy observed that such articles are "means of access to the supernatural", and are criticized by some as superstition. Devotional articles owned by famous religious figures, such as Catholic Saints, commonly become religious relics. Widespread popularity of certain devotional articles has, throughout centuries, influenced the public popular image of certain religious symbols, such as angels.

See also
 Amulet
 Cetiya
 Holy card
 Monza ampullae
 Pilgrim badge
 Prayer beads
 Prayer wheels
 Religious art
 Religious goods store
 Religious tourism
 Talisman
 Thangka

External links 

 Collection: "Devotional Objects Across Religions" from the University of Michigan Museum of Art
 Devotional objects at the Museum of New Zealand Te Papa Tongarewa

References

Religious art
Memorabilia
Sociology of religion